Robert H. Ivy (1881–1974) was an American oral and plastic surgeon who is known to develop the team approach or multidisciplinary treatment involving care of children with Cleft lip and cleft palate. He is one of the early pioneers in the specialty of plastic surgery due to his surgical experience in World War I. During an intermaxillary fixation technique, Ivy Loop or Eyelet Wiringis named after Dr. Ivy.

Life
He was born on 21 May 1881 at 73c Manchester Road, Southport, Lancashire, England, the son of Robert Sutcliffe Ivy and Annie Edith Cryer. He emigrated to the United States after 1891 and became naturalised in 1913. His uncle was Matthew Henry Cryer, by whom Robert's father was convinced to travel to the U.S. Robert's father studied dentistry and joined Matthew Cryer at his practice. Dr. Ivy went back to England to attend the Emmanuel School. At the age of 18 years in 1898, Dr. Ivy attended the University of Pennsylvania School of Dental Medicine upon the influence of his uncle Dr. Cryer. Robert then attended University of Pennsylvania School of Medicine soon after. He served as the first dental intern in the United States in 1901 at the Philadelphia General Hospital. Upon the request of his father, Robert interrupted his studies during the 3rd year of medical school and went to China to practice dentistry. After returning from China, Robert completed his medical school education.

Dr. Vilrary P. Blair had tremendous influence on Dr. Ivy's career as an oral surgeon. Dr. Ivy worked as an assistant to Dr. Blair at the Surgeon's General Office in Washington in 1917. Later he was assigned to Base Hospital in France which saw a lot of patient's with face, head and jaw injuries. Dr. Ivy also learned French during his stay in France practicing oral surgery during World War I.

Dr. Ivy played an instrumental role in making the Journal of Plastic and Reconstructive Surgery one of the world's first reading journal on Plastic Surgery. There is a society that is named after Dr. Ivy named Robert H. Ivy Pennsylvania Plastic Surgery Society. The society was formed in 1954.

He wrote a textbook named Applied anatomy and oral surgery for dental students.

Positions
 Journal of Plastic and Reconstructive Surgery - Chief Editor (1942)
 Bureau of Maternal and Child Health of Pennsylvania, Cleft Palate Division - Director (1919)
 American Society of Plastic Surgeons - President 
 American Board of Plastic Surgery - Founding Member (1938)
 Blockley Almshouse - First Dental Intern (1901-1903)

Awards
 Alumni Award of Merit - Alumni Society of University of Pennsylvania 
 Strittmatter Award - Philadelphia County Medical Society (1946)
 Trimble Lecture Award 
 First Award by the Foundation of American Society of Plastic and Reconstructive Surgery

References

1881 births
1974 deaths
People from Southport
American dentists
American dentistry academics
American plastic surgeons
University of Pennsylvania School of Dental Medicine alumni
Perelman School of Medicine at the University of Pennsylvania alumni
British emigrants to the United States
20th-century surgeons
20th-century dentists